Cuffee, Cuffey, or Coffey is a first name and surname recorded in African-American culture, believed to be derived from the Akan language name Kofi, meaning "born on a Friday". This was noted as one of the most common male names of West African origin which was retained by some American slaves.

Racist connotation

The name was used in the United States as a derogatory term to refer to Black people.  For example, Jefferson Davis, then a US Senator from Mississippi who later became the President of the Confederate States, said that the discussion of slavery in the Dred Scott v. Sandford case was merely a question of "whether Cuffee should be kept in his normal condition or not."

Notable people

United States
 Paul Cuffee (1759-1817), a Massachusetts freeman and shipping magnate. Cuffee rejected the surname of his former owner, Slocum, and replaced it with his father's Akan name.

 Edward Emerson Cuffee (1902-1959), a jazz musician born in Norfolk, Virginia who would move to New York City in 1920 to pursue his career as a jazz trombonist.

Jamaica
 Cuffee, A maroon who waged a slave rebellion against plantation owners in Jamaica in the early 1800s.

See also
 Quander family, Oldest documented African-American family in the United States whose surname is of Fante origin.

References

African-American culture